Abdullah Abdulaziz Al-Joud (born July 7, 1975, in Al-Thuqbah) is a Saudi Arabian long-distance runner. At the 2012 Summer Olympics, he competed in the Men's 5000 metres, finishing 39th overall in Round 1, failing to qualify for the final.  He finished 48th overall at the world half marathon championships in 2014 with a national record of 1:02.58.  He was the first Saudi athlete to compete in the world half marathon championships. Abdullah was coached to a competitive level (2004-2015) by UK and Irish coaches Ian Wilson and Teresa Wilson.

References

External links

1975 births
Living people
Saudi Arabian male long-distance runners
Olympic athletes of Saudi Arabia
Athletes (track and field) at the 2012 Summer Olympics
Athletes (track and field) at the 2010 Asian Games
World Athletics Championships athletes for Saudi Arabia
Asian Games competitors for Saudi Arabia
People from Eastern Province, Saudi Arabia
21st-century Saudi Arabian people
20th-century Saudi Arabian people